Virginia Louise Sorensen (née Eggertsen; February 17, 1912 – December 24, 1991), also credited as Virginia Sorenson, was an American regionalist writer. Her role in Utah and Mormon literature places her within the "lost generation" of Mormon writers. She was awarded the 1957 Newbery Medal for her children's novel, Miracles on Maple Hill.

Biography
Virginia Sorensen was born on February 17, 1912, to Helen ElDiva Blackett and Claud E. Eggertsen in Provo, Utah, but grew up in Manti and American Fork, Utah. Her parents were descended from Mormon pioneers; her mother identified as a Christian Scientist, while Sorensen described her father as a Jack Mormon. Because of this, she wrote from a liminal position between Mormon and mainstream western American life. Of this circumstance, she said of her siblings and herself, "We all felt obliged to be especially good and bright because our parents weren't active church people." From an early age, she wrote poetry and told stories to friends and family.

She attended Brigham Young University, where she met her first husband, Frederick C. Sorensen, who taught English at a local high school. She graduated from BYU with a bachelor's degree in journalism. The couple moved several times throughout their 25 years of marriage for Frederick's work. While living in Terre Haute, Indiana, where Frederick was a professor at what is now Indiana State University, Sorensen published her first novel, A Little Lower Than the Angels. Her publisher, Alfred Knopf, wrote in the book jacket, "I have seldom introduced a new novelist with the confidence I feel in the author of this remarkable book. It marks the debut, I believe, of a major American writer." The novel approached the history of Mormon polygamy with realism which was poorly received in Utah, despite the novel doing well elsewhere in America. "She sought to please her...Mormon contemporaries, yet was surprised to find her efforts tarred with suspicion", wrote her biographer, Mary L. Bradford.

Sorensen wrote several Mormon-themed books. Despite this, she said of herself, "As a writer and as a person, I can honestly say that I am not particularly interested in Mormons.” As a regionalist author, she primarily drew inspiration from the places where she was living and often based her characters directly on people she knew or had met. Her first book for children, Curious Missy, grew out of her efforts helping her county in Alabama obtain a bookmobile, and her 1957 Newbery Medal-winning Miracles on Maple Hill was based in the Erie, Pennsylvania region where she lived at that time.  Her collection of short stories, Where Nothing is Long Ago, was described by Eugene England as "essentially a collection of personal essays rather than short stories,"  but Sorenson reaffirmed that the collection is fictional. From 1966 to 1967, Sorensen was writer-in-residence at University of Central Oklahoma (then called Central State College), where she met Alec Waugh.

Personal life 
Sorensen had two children with her first husband: Frederick Sorensen Jr. and Elizabeth Hepburn. In 1958 she divorced Frederick, and in 1969 married author Alec Waugh at the Rock of Gibraltar. She later converted to Anglicanism at Waugh's request. Sorensen and Waugh lived primarily in Morocco but moved back to the states when Alec's health began to fail in 1980. After Alec died, she moved to North Carolina, where she died on December 24, 1991, at the age of 79. Her ashes were buried in the Provo Cemetery, next to her mother and sister.

Awards and honors 
Sorensen received two Guggenheim fellowships, one in 1946 to study a tribe of Mexican Indians for her novel The Proper Gods, and one in 1954 to study in Denmark the history of Sanpete Valley's settlers. In 1991, she was granted an Honorary Lifetime Membership in the Association for Mormon Letters.

Bibliography
For adults
A Little Lower Than the Angels (novel) – 1942, Knopf
On this Star – 1946, Reynal & Hitchcock
The Neighbors – 1947, Reynal & Hitchcock
The Evening and The Morning – 1949, Harcourt, Brace and Co.
The Proper Gods – 1952, Harcourt, Brace & Co.
Many Heavens – 1954, Harcourt & Brace
Kingdom Come – 1960, Harcourt & Brace
Where Nothing is Long Ago – 1963, Harcourt & Brace
The Man with the Key – 1974, Harcourt Brace & Co. Jovanovich

For children
Curious Missie – 1953, Harcourt Brace
The House Next Door: Utah 1896; 1954, Scribners
Plain Girl – 1955, Harcourt Brace, won the Child Study Award
Miracles on Maple Hill – 1957, Harcourt Brace, won the Child Study Award and the 1957 John Newbery Medal
Lotte's Locket – 1964, Harcourt Brace
Around the Corner – 1973, Harcourt Brace
Friends of the Road – 1978, Atheneum

See also

Simon P. Eggertsen Sr. House (home of grandfather)

References

External links
 Virginia Sorensen manuscript books, MSS 2103, at Brigham Young University, Harold B. Lee Library, L. Tom Perry Special Collections
 
 Virginia Sorensen at Library of Congress Authorities — with 26 catalog records

 

1912 births
1991 deaths
20th-century American novelists
20th-century American women writers
American children's writers
American Latter Day Saints
American women novelists
Brigham Young University alumni
Newbery Medal winners
American women children's writers
Novelists from Utah
Writers from Provo, Utah
Harold B. Lee Library-related 20th century articles